At the 1968 Winter Olympics, ten Nordic skiing events were contested – seven cross-country skiing events, two ski jumping events, and one Nordic combined event.

1968 Winter Olympics events
1968